is a town located in Tagawa District, Fukuoka Prefecture, Japan. As of 2016, the town has an estimated population of 9,802 and a density of 74 persons per km². The total area is 132.10 km².

Geography

Climate
Soeda has a humid subtropical climate (Köppen: Cfa).

Demographics
Per Japanese census data, the population of Soeda in 2020 is 8,801 people. Soeda has been conducting censuses since 1920.

References

External links

Soeda official website 

Towns in Fukuoka Prefecture